The Russia national football team represents Russia in international association football under the control of the Russian Football Union. Russia is a member of FIFA and UEFA.

After the dissolution of the Soviet Union in December 1991, all the organizations, including the football federation, were disbanded. Since the Soviet Union had already qualified for the Euro 1992, a new team and association representing the Commonwealth of Independent States was formed. The team ceased to exist shortly after the Euro 92.

Russia played its first international against Mexico on 16 August 1992 at the Lokomotiv Stadium in Moscow, winning the match 2–0.

From its inception, the Russian squad has participated in four World Cups (1994, 2002, 2014 and 2018 – the latter as hosts), one Confederations Cup (2017) and five European Championship (1996, 2004, 2008, 2012 and 2016).

This is a list of the Russia national football team results from 1992 to 2019.

Key

1990s

1992

1993

1994

1995

1996

1997

1998

1999

2000s

2000

2001

2002

2003

2004

2005

2006

2007

2008

2009

2010s

2010

2011

2012

2013

2014

2015

2016

2017

2018

2019

Venues in Russia
Included 2017 Confederations Cup and 2018 World Cup Russia matches

See also
Russia national football team results (2020–present)

Notes

External links
RFS Match Archive
Russia – List of International Matches – RSSSF

References

Russia national football team results